1974–75 was the 28th season of the Western International Hockey League.

Standings

 Spokane Flyers					53		35	16	 2				288	218		 72
 Cranbrook Royals				53		33	17	 3				283	198		 69
 Kimberley Dynamiters			        53		23	30	 0				208	248		 46
 Trail Smoke Eaters				53		21	30	 2				224	251		 44
 Nelson Maple Leafs 				53		18	34	 1				206	272		 37
 Portland Buckaroos (independent team)		25		10	13	 2				103	125		 22

Playoffs
In the "Best of 7" semi-finals:
Spokane Flyers defeated Trail Smoke Eaters 4 games to 1 (4-3, 4–1, 4–3, 3–7, 7–1)
Cranbrook Royals defeated Kimberley Dynamiters 4 games to 2 (7-8 OT, 7–3, 4–2, 7–10, 11–3, 8–2)

In the "Best of 7" final, the Spokane Flyers defeated Cranbrook Royals 4 games to 3 (3-2, 3–7, 2–6, 6–3, 4–3, 4-5 OT, 13–7). The Spokane Flyers advanced to the 1974-75 Western Canada Allan Cup Playoffs.

References 

The Spokesman-Review - Jul 4, 1974

Western International Hockey League seasons
WIHL
WIHL